The William Martin House is a building and property in Brentwood, Tennessee, United States, that dates from c.1910 and was listed on the National Register of Historic Places (NRHP) in 1988. It has also been known as Boxwood Hall. It is a two-story house that was built c.1850 but was extensively remodeled into Colonial Revival style in c.1910. The NRHP eligibility of the property was covered in a 1988 study of Williamson County historical resources.

References

Colonial Revival architecture in Tennessee
Houses completed in 1850
Houses in Williamson County, Tennessee
Houses on the National Register of Historic Places in Tennessee
National Register of Historic Places in Williamson County, Tennessee